The Western Isles Hospital is a rural general hospital in Stornoway on Lewis in the Western Isles of Scotland. It is managed by NHS Western Isles.

History
The hospital was built at a cost of £32 million and was officially opened by Prince Charles, Duke of Rothesay in March 1993. A six-bedded stroke rehabilitation unit opened in 2007. In late 2014 the health board announced a Dual-energy X-ray absorptiometry (DEXA) scanner service would be based at the hospital.

Services
The hospital has 116 beds across a range of specialities, including general medicine, geriatrics, paediatrics, general surgery, orthopaedics, obstetrics and gynaecology and psychiatry. Within the hospital there is a learning centre and purpose-built facilities for clinical skills training.

References

External links
 

Hospital buildings completed in 1992
NHS Western Isles
Hospitals in the Outer Hebrides
Stornoway
NHS Scotland hospitals